Inspector "Tequila" Yuen is a fictional character who appears in the 1992 film Hard Boiled and the 2007 video game Stranglehold, played and voiced by Chow Yun-fat. He is an inspector with the Hong Kong Police Force and is extremely skilled with fire arms. He is also a heavy drinker, which led to him being nicknamed "tequila".

Tequila Yuen is introduced in Hard Boiled playing a clarinet in a bar, where, it seems, is the only place he feels at home. The barman, Mr. Woo, also seems to be his closest friend. Tequila is also portrayed as a typical anti-hero and he has a total disregard for authority. Although he shows little emotion other than anger for most of the time, he proves to be a loyal friend and a romantic, with strong moral values.

Concept and creation

After creating films which focused on the lives of gangsters, director John Woo wanted to make a film that glorified the police instead. Woo admired Clint Eastwood's and Steve McQueen's characters from their films Dirty Harry and Bullitt respectively, and wanted to make his own Hong Kong-style Dirty Harry police detective film. While creating this character, Woo was inspired by a police officer who was a strong-willed and tough member of the police force, as well as being an avid drummer. This led to Woo having Tequila's character be a musician as well as a cop.

Biography

Hard Boiled
Yuen first appeared in Hard Boiled in 1992. The film begins with him leading a squad of police officers into a Hong Kong teahouse where an arms deal is taking place. A shoot-out then ensued and a number of police officers were wounded and his partner, Benny, killed. Tequila then executed the gangster who killed Benny, rather than arrest him. For this, he was ordered off the case by his Superintendent, Pang, as the gangster was a senior member of a local Triad. Despite his orders, he continued with the case and went after "Uncle" Hoi, a Triad boss. He went to a warehouse that Hoi's gang owned, but found that he and his men had been killed by a rival group led by Johnny Wong. Another gun fight broke out and Tequila killed most of the opposing gangsters. When he was face-to-face with Alan, one of Wong's men, he was unable to kill him as he was out of bullets. Alan was then free to kill Tequila, but chose not to. Pang later revealed that Alan was an undercover police officer, and that one of the gangsters killed earlier in the teahouse was also deep cover. Yuen then set up a meeting with Tony to sort out the situation. They met at the docks, but were attacked by the remaining members of Hoi's gang. They manage to kill their attackers.

Tequila's informant, Foxy, was badly beaten by Wong's gang and left for dead. He then found Tequila and was taken to a hospital, which is owned by Wong. There, Wong sent Alan and three other men to kill the pair. Alan and Tequila then eliminated the two of the men. While the two bickered with each other, the third man, Mad Dog, killed Foxy. They then discovered a hidden entry to the hospital morgue where they found Wong's arsenal of guns. Mad Dog attacked them, but then escaped by locking the pair in Wong's armory. Johnny Wong saw that his arsenal was compromised proceeded to take the entire hospital hostage. Amongst the hostages were Superintendent Pang and Officer Teresa Chang (Tequila's girlfriend) who were called to the scene. Alan and Tequila eventually fought their way through the hospital and freed the hostages before going after Wong. The pair split up; Tequila began evacuating babies from the maternity ward as Wong had planted explosives all over the building, and Alan faced off against Mad Dog. When the bombs were detonating, Tequila escaped with the babies and Alan and Wong went missing in the confusion. Wong later emerged with Alan as hostage. He made Tequila humiliate himself by slapping his own face and admitting his incompetence in exchange for Tony's life. In an awkward struggle with Wong, Alan shot himself in the stomach before Tequila grabbed the gun and shot Wong in the eye. Alan survived, however, and began a new life after Pang burned his file.

Stranglehold
Tequila Yuen then made his second appearance fifteen years later in the 2007 video game, Stranglehold. The story kicks off with a Hong Kong police officer being kidnapped, and the kidnappers phoning the police and telling them to send one officer to a Kowloon marketplace to make a deal. The police chief, Lee, believed this to be a trap and insisted on sending in a squad, but if it was to be one man alone it would be Jerry Ying. Ying disqualified himself, however, as he was deep cover in the Dragon Claw Triad, and this could expose him as a policeman. Tequila then put himself forward for the task. When he arrived at the marketplace, he was attacked by a group of gunmen belonging to the Imperial Nines Triad. After disposing of them after a long gun battle, he discovered the missing officer's badge, with a bullet hole through the centre, and a photograph of the dead officer. Later that night, he stopped in at a local bar where the Imperial Nines were making a deal with another Triad group, the Golden Kane. One of the Golden Kane members recognised Tequila and pointed him out. The Imperial Nines then panicked and shot the Golden Kane gangsters and tried to kill Tequila. He shot them down, however. After emerging from the barroom shoot-out unscathed, he informed his superiors that he would be travelling to Tai O, where the Imperial Nines are based, to investigate further.

Upon his arrival in Tai O, he asked a local fisherman about Triad activity in the area. The fisherman then told Tequila that Tai O is under the control of the Imperial Nines, but that the Golden Kane are muscling in. He also revealed that the leader of the boss of the Dragon Claw, Jimmy Wong, was residing on a boat nearby. Tequila then tracked Wong down and discovered that Jerry Ying was working as a henchman for him. Wong then revealed that the GK killed the officer and pinned it on the I9s, and the only reason that he hasn't retaliated is because the GK and the Zakarov crime family, a Russian Mafia based in Chicago, have kidnapped his daughter, Billie, and granddaughter, Teko. The Zakarovs and GK want the DC to hand over some of their turf in Hong Kong as payment for Billie and Teko's safe return. Tequila then decided to go after the kidnappers, and it is suggested that Billie is the wife of Tequila and Teko is their daughter. After the meeting, the GK attacked but Wong and Tequila both escaped unhurt. Tequila then visited the Mega Restaurant and Casino which is owned by GK boss Yung Gi. He was unable to find Gi, who escaped and flew to Chicago to meet the Zakarov brothers, but did eliminate his personal bodyguard, Ty Lok.

After his unsuccessful attempt to kill Gi in Hong Kong, Tequila flew to the US with Jerry and located Damon and Vladamir Zakarov, and Yung Gi in a Chicago penthouse. The pair then split up, and the tactic seemed to be working until Vlad's voice came over the PA system saying that Jerry had been killed. Tequila then fought his way past the Russian henchmen until he reached the top floor where he came face-to-face with Vlad. Zakarov then entered a helicopter which was shot down by Tequila. On his way to the exit of the building, he found Jerry lying wounded and helped him out. He then travelled across town to the Chicago Natural History Museum, which is owned by Damon Zakarov. Tequila arrived to find Damon and Yung Gi in a dispute over the fate of the women. This eventually led to a stand-off between both gangs, and Damon fled with Billie and Gi with Teko. Tequila hunted Damon down in another part of the museum, killed him and rescued Billie. However, just as all seemed well, Jerry entered the room and fired at the couple, hitting Billie and narrowly missing Tequila. He then shot and wounded Jerry, who fled the scene. He then turned back to find Billie dying of her wounds. With her last moments of life, she told Tequila that Yung Gi had taken Teko back to Hong Kong. Tequila then chased Jerry down and asked him who hired him to take him out. Jerry tells Tequila that it was Wong, before being shot dead after a prolonged gun battle.

Back in Hong Kong, Tequila and Yung Gi met to make a deal. Tequila wants his daughter back, but Yung refuses as he knows that he can still use her to gain some of Wong's turf. Tequila then showed Yung a text message from Wong to Jerry, confirming that the Dragon Claw plan to eliminate the Golden Kane. Yung then called a meeting with Wong in Kowloon, planning for Tequila to show up and take out Wong and his gang. Tequila did show up as speculated, but took out Yung and Wong's bodyguard, Dapang, while Wong himself escaped with Teko. Tequila then drove to Wong's large estate in the New Territories where he was met with a large and well equipped army. Tequila, nonetheless, eliminated the army and an attack helicopter, and entered Wong's home. There, Wong had Tequila pinned down with a sniper rifle, but just before he took the shot, Teko rushed in and pushed Wong off the balcony, killing him. Tequila is then re-handed his badge by Chief Lee, who earlier confiscated it, and re-united with his daughter.

Gun Runner

In the cancelled sequel to Stranglehold entitled Gun Runner Chow Yun Fat was expected to reprise his role as Inspector Tequila, who would have partnered up with a new character played by Vin Diesel (whether or not Diesel's character is Milo Burik from Midway's other title Wheelman is unconfirmed). However, due to Midway's bankruptcy in 2009, the game was officially cancelled.

Reception

Empire magazine ranked Tequila 33rd in their "The 100 Greatest Movie Characters" poll.

References

Film characters introduced in 1992
Action film characters
Crime film characters
Fictional alcohol abusers
Fictional gunfighters
Fictional jazz musicians
Fictional Hong Kong people
Fictional police officers in films
Fictional vigilantes